The Minnesota Boxing Hall of Fame is a commemorative organization with plans to create a museum. It celebrates the history of boxing in the state of Minnesota by honoring individuals whose achievements within the sport are noteworthy.

History
Though several individuals had previously considered creating a hall of fame for Minnesota boxing, it was noted boxing historian Jake Wegner who pulled together the local boxing community in 2009, filed for nonprofit status, and assembled a board of directors for the new hall.  With Wegner as the president, the board consisted of Jeff Flanagan (Vice-President), Don Evans (Treasurer), Jim Wells (Secretary), Denny Nelson, Jim Carlin, and Wayne Bebeau.  The inaugural class of inductees was announced on July 5, 2010  and the induction banquet took place on October 12, 2010.

In April 2014, founder and President, Jake Wegner resigned from the organization.

In May 2014, Jeff Flanagan was elected president. The Minnesota Boxing  board consists of Vice President Denny Nelson, Secretary Jim Wells, Treasurer Don Evans,
Executive board members Mark Nelson and Pete Holm.

Location
A permanent location for the museum has not been determined.  www.mnbhof.org

Inductees

Class of 2010
Date:   October 12, 2010

Venue:    Jax Café Steakhouse.  Minneapolis, MN
 Del Flanagan
 Glen Flanagan
 Mike Gibbons
 Tommy Gibbons
 Will Grigsby
 Bill Kaehn
 Scott LeDoux
 Harris Martin
 Don Riley
 Rafael Rodriguez
 Dr. Sheldon Segal

Class of 2011
Date: October 11, 2011Venue:  Nicollet Island Pavilion.  Minneapolis, MN
 Charley Kemmick
 Mike O'Dowd
 Johnny Ertle
 Jackie Graves
 Duane Bobick
 Mike Evgen
 Joe Daszkiewicz
 Emmett Weller
 George Barton

Class of 2012
Date: September 28, 2012Venue:  Mystic Lake Casino.  Prior Lake, MN
 Oscar Gardner
 Jimmy Delaney
 Billy Miske
 Lee Savold
 Jim Beattie
 Jerry Slavin
 Dick Cullum
 Denny Nelson

Class of 2013
Date: September 27, 2013Venue:  Mystic Lake Casino.  Prior Lake, MN
 Danny Needham
 Jock Malone
 Billy Petrolle
 Pat O'Connor
 Doug Demmings
 Gary Holmgren
 Dan Schommer
 Tony Stecher
 Jack Raleigh

Class of 2014
Date: October 3, 2014Venue:  Mystic Lake Casino.  Prior Lake, MN
 King Tut
 Jack Gibbons
 Bobby Rodriguez
 Al Andrews
 Jim Morgan
 Jimmy O'Hara

Class of 2015
Date: October 2, 2015Venue: Mystic Lake Casino.  Prior Lake, MN
Danny Davis
Duane Horsman
Mel Brown
Art Lasky
Charley Retzlaff
Sammy Gallop
Mike Collins
Jim Wells

Class of 2016
Date: October 14, 2016Venue: Mystic Lake Casino.  Prior Lake, MN
Rodney Bobick
Jim Hegerle
Larry LaCoursiere
Fred Lenhart
My Sullivan
George Blair
Leo Ryan
Earl Kaehn
Pat Killen

Notes

External links
Official website

Boxing museums and halls of fame
Halls of fame in Minnesota
State sports halls of fame in the United States
Sports museums in Minnesota
Awards established in 2009